"Mi bebito fiu fiu" is a parody song by Peruvian DJ and producer Tito Silva Music with vocals by Tefi C. It was released on May 20, 2022. Its instrumental base is based on the song "Stan" by American rapper Eminem, which in turn is based on "Thank You" by British singer Dido. The song deals with the alleged romance and political scandal involving former Peruvian president Martín Vizcarra and Zully Pinchi, a candidate for the political party We Are Peru.

"Mi bebito fiu fiu" became a social and internet phenomenon. The song tells the story of Vizcarra's alleged infidelity to his wife, Maribel Díaz Cabello, with Pinchi.

Background 

The lyrics of "Mi bebito fiu fiu" were inspired by a series of leaked WhatsApp messages that Zully Pinchi Ramírez, a lawyer and former congressional candidate for the We Are Peru political party, sent to Martín Vizcarra. The conversation between them was revealed in the Peruvian TV show Panorama on 15 May 2022.

The Peruvian prosecutor investigated Vizcarra's trip to Cusco, which included a stay at Belmond Hotel Monasterio. Gossip magazines picked up the story and published leaked messages.

Composition 

After the revelation on the Panorama TV show, music producer Tito Silva composed the lyrics by interpolating phrases from the leaked private messages with a 2014 poem written by Pinchi titled "Las noches que te soñé". Tefi C. proposed the idea of creating the song and she provided the vocals.

Popularity 

In its first month, the official video clip of the song reached 10 million views on the YouTube Music platform. In June 2022, Tito Silva and Tefi C. performed the song on the program Yo soy de Latina, and appeared on television and radio programs, including 24 Horas on Panamericana Televisión.

The song became popular on TikTok platform, where it was used 84,000 times with more than 552 million views as of 7 July 2022, and went viral worldwide after Puerto Rican singer Bad Bunny mentioned it during a live stream on Instagram. After it became popular, Silva decided to remove it from streaming platforms to avoid legal issues to the composers of the baseline songs.

Charts

Notes

References 

2022 songs
Political Internet memes
Songs about infidelity
Spanish-language songs
Works subject to a lawsuit